Marthe Koala (born 8 March 1994) is a Burkinabe athlete competing in the 100 metres hurdles and heptathlon. At the 2012 and the 2020 Summer Olympics, she competed in the women's 100 metres hurdles. She also competed in the women's heptathlon at the 2020 Summer Olympics, but was injured during the shot put and was unable to participate in the remaining four events.

Competition record

References

1994 births
Living people
People from Bobo-Dioulasso
Burkinabé female hurdlers
Burkinabé heptathletes
Olympic athletes of Burkina Faso
Athletes (track and field) at the 2012 Summer Olympics
Athletes (track and field) at the 2016 Summer Olympics
African Games medalists in athletics (track and field)
African Games gold medalists in athletics (track and field)
African Games gold medalists for Burkina Faso
African Games silver medalists for Burkina Faso
African Games bronze medalists for Burkina Faso
Athletes (track and field) at the 2011 All-Africa Games
Athletes (track and field) at the 2015 African Games
Athletes (track and field) at the 2019 African Games
World Athletics Championships athletes for Burkina Faso
Universiade medalists for Burkina Faso
Universiade medalists in athletics (track and field)
Medalists at the 2019 Summer Universiade
Athletes (track and field) at the 2020 Summer Olympics
21st-century Burkinabé people
African Championships in Athletics winners
Burkinabé long jumpers
Islamic Solidarity Games medalists in athletics